Rafael Marques may refer to:

Rafael Marques (journalist) (born 1971), Angolan journalist and human rights activist
Rafael Marques (footballer, born May 1983), full name Rafael Marques Mariano, Brazilian football striker
Rafael Marques (footballer, born September 1983), full name Rafael Marques Pinto, Brazilian football centre-back
Rafael Marques (footballer, born 1989), Portuguese footballer who plays as a goalkeeper
Rafaël Marques Dias Brito (born 1991), Portuguese footballer who plays as a midfielder

See also
Rafael Márquez (disambiguation)